The Romanian General Inspectorate for Emergency Situations ( - IGSU) is a public structure subordinated to the Ministry of Internal Affairs, created on December 15, 2004, by merging the Civil Defense Command with the General Inspectorate of the Military Firefighters Corps. The structure is specialised in fire safety and civil protection.

At the national level, IGSU coordinates all the organizations involved in the management of emergency situations in compliance with international standards.

At the local level (in counties), the branches are called County Inspectorate for Emergency Situations (acronym: ISU), with each branch having multiple subunits (fire stations, detachments, intervention guards).

Firefighter ranks 
Officer ranks

Other ranks

See also 
 SMURD
 List of fire departments

External links 
 I.G.S.U. Official site

Emergency services in Romania
Fire departments of Romania